Ficopomatus is a genus of annelids belonging to the family Serpulidae.

The genus has cosmopolitan distribution.

Species:

Ficopomatus enigmaticus 
Ficopomatus macrodon 
Ficopomatus miamiensis 
Ficopomatus shenzhensis 
Ficopomatus talehsapensis 
Ficopomatus uschakovi

References

Annelids